Neuropilin-1 is a protein that in humans is encoded by the NRP1 gene. In humans, the neuropilin 1 gene is located at 10p11.22. This is one of two human neuropilins.

Function 

NRP1 is a membrane-bound coreceptor to a tyrosine kinase receptor for both vascular endothelial growth factor (for example, VEGFA) and semaphorin (for example, SEMA3A) family members. NRP1 plays versatile roles in angiogenesis, axon guidance, cell survival, migration, and invasion.[supplied by OMIM]

Interactions 

Neuropilin 1 has been shown to interact with Vascular endothelial growth factor A.

Role in COVID-19 

Research has shown that neuropilin 1 facilitates entry of SARS-CoV-2 into cells, making it a possible target for future antiviral drugs.

Implication in cancer 

Neuropilin 1 has been implicated in the vascularization and progression of cancers. NRP1 expression has been shown to be elevated in a number of human patient tumor samples, including brain, prostate, breast, colon, and lung cancers and NRP1 levels are positively correlated with metastasis.

In prostate cancer NRP1 has been demonstrated to be an androgen-suppressed gene, upregulated during the adaptive response of prostate tumors to androgen-targeted therapies and a prognostic biomarker of clinical metastasis and lethal PCa. In vitro and in vivo mouse studies have shown membrane bound NRP1 to be proangiogenic and that NRP1 promotes the vascularization of prostate tumors.

Elevated NRP1 expression is also correlated with the invasiveness of non-small cell lung cancer both in vitro and in vivo.

Target for cancer therapies 

As a co-receptor for VEGF, NRP1 is a potential target for cancer therapies. A synthetic peptide, EG3287, was generated in 2005 and has been shown to block NRP1 activity. EG3287 has been shown to induce apoptosis in tumor cells with elevated NRP1 expression. A patent for EG3287 was filed in 2002 and approved in 2003. As of 2015 there were no clinical trials ongoing or completed for EG3287 as a human cancer therapy.

Soluble NRP1 has the opposite effect of membrane bound NRP1 and has anti-VEGF activity. In vivo mouse studies have shown that injections of sNRP-1 inhibits progression of acute myeloid leukemia in mice.

References

Further reading 

 
 
 
 
 
 
 
 
 
 
 
 
 
 
 
 
 

Proteins